Powerlifting at the 2018 Asian Para Games was held in Jakarta between 7 and 12 October 2018.

Medal table

Medalists

Men

Women

See also
Powerlifting at the 2017 ASEAN Para Games
Weightlifting at the 2018 Asian Games

References

External links
 Para Powerlifting - Asian Para Games 2018
 RESULT SYSTEM - ASIAN PARA GAMES JAKARTA 2018

2018 Asian Para Games events